The 23rd Venice Biennale, held in 1942, was an exhibition of international contemporary art, with 11 participating nations. The Venice Biennale takes place biennially in Venice, Italy. Winners of the Gran Premi (Grand Prize) included Hungarian painter Arthur Kampf, Swiss sculptor Charles Otto Bänninger, Swedish etcher Stif Borglind, and Italians painter Alberto Salietti, sculptor Francesco Messina, and etcher Luigi Bartolini.

References

Bibliography

Further reading 

 

1942 in art
1942 in Italy
Venice Biennale exhibitions